The men's long jump F37/38 event at the 2008 Summer Paralympics took place at the Beijing National Stadium at 18:33 on 9 September. There was a single round of competition; after the first three jumps, only the top eight had 3 further jumps.
The competition was won by Farhat Chida, representing .

Results

 
WR = World Record. SB = Seasonal Best. Gold medal decided by second-best jumps (IAAF rule 180.19).

References

Athletics at the 2008 Summer Paralympics